Louisiana elected its members July 3–5, 1826.

See also 
 1826 and 1827 United States House of Representatives elections
 List of United States representatives from Louisiana

Notes 

1826
Louisiana
United States House of Representatives